Comet Tuttle may mean:
 8P/Tuttle (a.k.a. 8P/1790 A2, 1790 II, 8P/1858 A1, 1858 I, 8P/1871 T1, 1871 III, 1871d, 1885 IV, 1885b, 1899 III, 1899b, 1912 IV, 1912b, 1926 IV, 1926a, 1939 X, 1939k, 1967 V, 1967a, 1980 XIII, 1980h, 1994 XV, 1992r)
 Either of these long-period comets:
 C/1858 R1 (a.k.a. 1858 VII)
 C/1861 Y1 (a.k.a. 1861 III)
 A partial reference to these other comets:
 109P/Swift-Tuttle (a.k.a. 109P/-68 Q1, 109P/188 O1, 109P/1737 N1, 1737 II, 109P/1862 O1, 1862 III, 109P/1992 S2, 1992 XXVIII, 1992t)
 55P/Tempel-Tuttle (a.k.a. 55P/1366 U1, 55P/1699 U1, 1699 II, 55P/1865 Y1, 1866 I, 55P/1965 M2, 1965 IV, 1965i, 55P/1997 E1)
 41P/Tuttle-Giacobini-Kresák (a.k.a. 41P/1858 J1, 1858 III, 41P/1907 L1, 1907 III, 1907c, 41P/1951 H1, 1951 IV, 1951f, 1962 V, 1962b, 1973 VI, 1973b, 1978 XXV, 1978r, 1990 II, 1989b1)